Don't Blow Your Top can refer to two different things:

Don't Blow Your Top (album), a 1988 album by industrial band KMFDM.
"Don't Blow Your Top" (song), the title track from the album of the same name.